Božidar Antunović (born July 24, 1991) is a Serbian shot puter. He was a Silver medalist at the World Junior Championships in Moncton, Canada.

He studied at the University of Arizona, where he was a 2-time consecutive NCAA All-American in Track and Field.

He then transferred to Southern Methodist University, where he played football, and earned his Bachelor of Science.

Competition record

External links
IAAF Profile
Arizona Wildcats profile
SMU Mustangs profile

1991 births
Living people
Sportspeople from Novi Sad
Serbian male shot putters
University of Arizona alumni
20th-century Serbian people
21st-century Serbian people